Eastern Egg Rock Island is an island in the Town of St. George in Knox County in the U.S. state of Maine. It is owned by the Maine Department of Inland Fisheries and Wildlife (MDIFW), and it is located off the southern Atlantic Coast of the state. Project Puffin, a restoration effort by the Audubon Society, is implemented on Eastern Egg Rock through a contract with the MDIFW.

Geography

Project Puffin

In 1973, Stephen W. Kress of the Audubon Society started Project Puffin, an effort to restore seabird colonies to the southern Maine area. Atlantic puffins from Newfoundland and terns were reintroduced to the island. Puffins had not been spotted on the island since 1885. Biologists from other countries joined the society to help coax the birds back to Maine's islands and control the population of predators. Techniques used for restoring the birds, such as playing recordings of puffin calls, were mostly effective, and Kress wrote a children's book about the success of the project.

With the help of fish delivered to Eastern Egg Rock, 69 percent of Maine's roseate terns were nesting there by 2004. Now the island is the southern limit of puffin habitat in North America. To protect the birds, the island is closed to visitors for the breeding season, which runs from April through August.

References

Further reading
 Kress, Stephen W. (1999). Project Puffin: How We Brought Puffins Back to Egg Rock. Gardiner, Maine: Tilbury House Publishers, .

External links

National Audubon Society
Islands of Knox County, Maine
Protected areas of Knox County, Maine
Islands of Maine
Coastal islands of Maine